Richard Lee Kenworthy (April 1, 1941 – April 22, 2010) was a third baseman  in Major League Baseball who played for the Chicago White Sox (1962, 1964–1968). Listed at 5' 9", 170 lb., Kenworthy batted and threw right-handed. He was born in Red Oak, Iowa, United States.

Kenworthy was signed by the White Sox in 1961 out of the University of Missouri.  He was assigned immediately to Class-A Clinton C-Sox, where he hit 22 home runs, a season team-record since then. Although Kenworthy finally caught on in the majors, he had to endure five more failed tryouts with Chicago, serving as a backup for Don Buford and Pete Ward.
 
In a six-season career, Kenworthy was a .215 hitter (54-for-251) with four home runs and 13 RBI in 125 games, including 12 runs, six doubles and one triple.

Kenworthy died in Kansas City, Missouri at the age of 69.

See also
Chicago White Sox all-time roster

External links
Baseball in Clinton, Iowa
Baseball Reference
Baseball Reference (Minors)
Obituary
Retrosheet
Venezuelan League

1941 births
2010 deaths
Baseball players from Iowa
Chicago White Sox players
Clinton C-Sox players
Eugene Emeralds players
Hawaii Islanders players
Indianapolis Indians players
Industriales de Valencia players
Lynchburg White Sox players
Major League Baseball third basemen
Navegantes del Magallanes players
American expatriate baseball players in Venezuela
People from Red Oak, Iowa
Tidewater Tides players
Tucson Toros players
University of Missouri alumni
Visalia White Sox players